Andrey Ashyhmin (born 2 December 1974) is a Belarusian professional football coach and former player.

External links
 Profile at teams.by
 

1974 births
Living people
Belarusian footballers
FC Neman Grodno players
FC Dynamo Brest players
Association football goalkeepers
FC Belcard Grodno players
FC Neman Mosty players
FC Lida players
FC Belshina Bobruisk players